Sami Abu Zuhri is a senior spokesman for the Palestinian organization Hamas. Zuhri gained notoriety on May 19, 2006, before which time he was a relatively unknown member of Hamas, when Palestinian security and customs officials discovered he had 640,000 euros on his person; another report claimed he held a larger sum of 900,000 euros, and confiscated it, after Zuhri dropped a concealed money belt at a routine border crossing from Egypt to the Gaza Strip. The news brought competing Hamas and Fatah paramilitary forces to the crossing checkpoint, which Zuhri refused to leave without the banknotes, which had been confiscated as contraband. Abu Zuhri told a reporter from the Arab broadcaster Al Jazeera that the money had been donated privately by individuals he met during a tour of Arab nations.

The European monitors, who took up the station when Israel pulled out of Gaza, are charged with checking for contraband, which sometimes includes weapons and food. Julio De La Guardia, a spokesman for the European Union contingent that monitors the passage, said travelers crossing through Rafah must declare all sums over $2,000.

Abu Zuhri stated his objection to the inclusion of what he referred to as the "so-called Holocaust" in the proposed UNRWA lesson plan for students in Gaza. He continued "we think it's more important to teach Palestinians the crimes of the Israeli occupation."

When the suspected perpetrators of the 2014 kidnapping and murder of Israeli teenagers, Marwan Qawasmahi and Amer Abu Aisha, were killed by Israel after resisting arrest, he said "Hamas praises the role the martyrs played in chasing down Israeli settlers and we stress that their assassination will not weaken the resistance".

In December 2014, Sami Abu Zuhri reportedly harassed a Gaza-based foreign female reporter and was being investigated by the Islamist group ruling the Gaza Strip.

References

External links
Washington Post 14 September 2008 Abbas aims to stay in office to 2010 despite Hamas Reuters article
Daily Telegraph Israeli minister vows Palestinian "holocaust" By Tim Butcher
Reuters 15 May 2008 Bush hails Israel's "chosen people" as Arabs lament
Hamas spokesman Abu Zuhri quoted  28 June 2004
Zuhri Interview with Sami Abu Zuhri, 30 September 2005
CNN News, Hamas official caught at border with more than $1 million 19 May 2006
ABC News: "Hamas Official Caught Smuggling $817,000"
IMEMC Abu Zuhri calls on Abbas to declare the failure of peace talks 26 April 2008
Ha'aretz 20 April 2008 Report: Hamas rejects Egyptian plan for truce with Israel
JpostHizbullah's terror chief killed in Damascus bombing By Yaakov Katz
Washington Post 5 August 2008 Gazans' Access To Care Faulted Israeli Interrogation Criticized in Report By Linda Gradstein

Year of birth missing (living people)
Living people
Islamic University of Gaza alumni

Hamas members
Palestinian Holocaust deniers